Gayeshwar Chandra Roy is a Bangladesh Nationalist Party (BNP) politician and former State minister who is currently serving as a standing committee (the highest policy-making forum) member of the party. He was also a Jatiya Samajtantrik Dal member during 1970's.

Early life
Roy was born on 1 November 1951 in Dhaka district of the then East Bengal, Dominion of Pakistan (now Bangladesh) to Gannandra Chandra Roy and Sumoti Roy.

Career
Roy was involved in progressive politics in his student life. In 1970's, he was a member of Jatiya Samajtantrik Dal. He joined 'Jatiyatabadi Jubo Dal', a political wing of the BNP in 1978. After the 5th parliamentary election in 1991, the BNP formed the government and Roy was made State minister for Environment and Forest (now Ministry of Environment, Forest and Climate Change) under the technocrat quota. Later, he was appointed as one of the joint secretary generals of BNP and then member of the Standing Committee.

References

Bangladesh Nationalist Party politicians
Living people
Bangladeshi Hindus
State Ministers of Environment and Forests (Bangladesh)
1951 births
People from Dhaka District